Francisco Manuel de Zúñiga Sotomayor y Mendoza, O.S.A. (1646–1712) was a Roman Catholic prelate who served as Bishop of Ciudad Rodrigo (1695–1712).

Biography
Francisco Manuel de Zúñiga Sotomayor y Mendoza was born in San Esteban de la Sierra, Spain, on 11 October 1646 and ordained a priest in the Order of Saint Augustine. On 21 March 1695, he was appointed by Pope Innocent XII as Bishop of Ciudad Rodrigo. On 19 June 1695, he was consecrated bishop by Federico Caccia, Titular Archbishop of Laodicea in Phrygia, with Antonio Pascual, Bishop of Vic, and Francisco Zapata Vera y Morales, Titular Bishop of Dara, serving as co-consecrators. 
He served as Bishop of Ciudad Rodrigo until his death on 14 December 1712.

References

External links and additional sources
 (for Chronology of Bishops) 
 (for Chronology of Bishops) 

17th-century Roman Catholic bishops in Spain
18th-century Roman Catholic bishops in Spain
Bishops appointed by Pope Innocent XII
1646 births
1712 deaths
Augustinian bishops